DNA-directed RNA polymerase I subunit RPA2 is an enzyme that in humans is encoded by the POLR1B gene.

References

Further reading